"Topsy"  was a 1938 instrumental release for bandleader Benny Goodman, written by Edgar Battle and Eddie Durham, which became a #14 pop hit. The tune had previously been recorded by Count Basie and His Orchestra on August 9, 1937.

In 1958, drummer Cozy Cole recorded the song and issued it in two parts as a single. The A-side ("Topsy I") made it to #27 on the Billboard Hot 100 chart, while the B-side ("Topsy II") reached #3 on the Hot 100 chart and #1 on the Billboard Rhythm & Blues chart, staying atop the latter for six weeks. The two songs were simultaneous hits; they were closest together on the Hot 100 chart for the week ending November 2, 1958, when Topsy I was at #27 and Topsy II was at #4.

Notable versions

Count Basie Orchestra
Charlie Christian (credited as "Swing to Bop")
Jimmy Giuffre, on his album Western Suite
The Chico Hamilton Quintet, on their album Chico Hamilton Quintet in Hi Fi
 Meco (1977)

References

1938 songs
1958 singles
Benny Goodman songs
Pop instrumentals
Cashbox number-one singles